This is a list of people from Hayward, California. People from Hayward who are strongly associated with the city include founder William Dutton Hayward, and the Ukrainian patriot and Greek Orthodox priest Agapius Honcharenko, who created a farm whose location is now a historic landmark. High-profile people from Hayward include football coach Bill Walsh, figure skater Kristi Yamaguchi, wrestler and film star Dwayne Johnson, and Treasurer of the United States Rosa Gumataotao Rios. Charles Plummer, prior to becoming Alameda County Sheriff, was the Police Chief of Hayward.

People born (b), raised (r) (including attending high school in Hayward), or who have lived as adults (a) in Hayward (bold names are current residents):

 Sena Acolatse (1990–) (b), hockey player
 Mahershala Ali (1974–) (r), Academy Award-winning actor
 Glen Alvelais (1968–) (b), heavy metal guitarist for Forbidden
 Max Baer (1909–1959) (a), boxer from the 1930s,  Heavyweight Champion of the World, actor
 Chauncey Bailey (October 20, 1949 – August 2, 2007) (r), murdered Oakland journalist
 Jeff Barnes (1955–) (r), National Football League linebacker
 Brian Beacock (1966–) (b), anime voice performer and actor
 Jeff Beal (1963–) (b), jazz instrumentalist, Emmy award-winning film and television music composer
 John Beck (1981–) (b), National Football League quarterback with the Washington Redskins
 Davone Bess (1985–) (b), National Football League Miami Dolphins wide receiver
 Larry Bliss (1946–) (a), educator and former politician from Maine, now an administrator at California State University, East Bay
 Kimberlin Brown (1961–) (b), actress who played Sheila Carter on The Young and the Restless and The Bold and the Beautiful
 Cory R. Carey (1979–) (a), professional wrestler, better known by his ring name, Tommy Drake
 D. J. Carrasco (1977–) (r), baseball player
 Eddie Chacon (r), of the band Charles & Eddie, performers of the single "Would I Lie to You?"
 Julie Clark (1948–) (b), aerobatic air show pilot, daughter of the murdered pilot of Pacific Air Lines Flight 773
 James Graham Cooper (1830–1902) (a), surgeon, naturalist with the California Geological Survey, director of the California Academy of Sciences
Brian Copeland (1974–) (r), playwright and author of Not a Genuine Black Man, a memoir of his experience growing up in the region

 Ellen Corbett (1954–) (a), California State Senator
 Vanessa Curry (1990–) (r), dancer, member of the Pussycat Dolls
 Marco Dapper (1983–) (b), actor and model

 Jack Del Rio (1963–) (r), Oakland Raiders head coach, former head coach of Jacksonville Jaguars
 Glenn Dishman (1970–) (r), Major League Baseball pitcher
 Fateh Doe (r), rapper, Punjabi artist
 Chris Eckert (1986–), actor and member of The Groundlings.
 Tom Eplin (1960–) (b), actor who played Jake McKinnon on the TV series Another World and As the World Turns
 Andy Ernst (a), music producer, operator of the Art of Ears Studio in Hayward
 Johnny Estrada (1976–) (b), Major League Baseball catcher
 Josh Ryan Evans (1982–2002) (b), actor who played Timmy Lenox on the TV series Passions
Lewis J. Feldman (1945–) (r), professor at UC Berkeley
 Forrest Fezler (1949–) (b), professional golfer
 Ed Galigher (1950–) (b), National Football League defensive lineman with the San Francisco 49ers
 Michaela Garecht (1979) (b), missing abduction victim
 Oscar Grant (1986–2009) (r,a), victim of BART police officer shooting ruled controversially as involuntary manslaughter
 Chelsea Gray (1992–) (b), professional basketball player
 Ted Griggs, businessman
 Bud Harrelson (1944–) (r), Major League Baseball shortstop
 William Dutton Hayward (1815–1891), city founder and namesake

 Agapius Honcharenko (1832–1916) (a), Ukrainian patriot and Greek Orthodox priest
 Eddie House (1978–) (r), National Basketball Association player for the Miami Heat
 Archie Johnson Inger (1883–1954) (a), spiritualist
 J. J. Jelincic (1948–) (a), member of the California Public Employees' Retirement System (CalPERS) Board and the past president of the California State Employees Association
 Charlton Jimerson (1979–) (r), Major League Baseball player
 Dwayne Johnson (1972–) (b), a.k.a. "The Rock", professional wrestler (ten-time world champion) and actor
 Tsuyako Kitashima (1918–2006) (b), activist for reparations to victims of the Japanese-American internment during World War II
 Claudia Kolb (1949–) (b), swimmer, Olympic gold medalist in the 1968 Summer Olympics
 Art Larsen (1925–2012) (b), eccentric tennis player, winner of the 1950 U.S. National Championships (now the U.S. Open)
 Michelle Le (1984–2011), nursing student missing from, and allegedly killed at, Hayward's Kaiser Hospital
 Darren Lewis (1967–) (r), Major League Baseball player
 Wes Littleton (1982–) (b), Major League Baseball pitcher with the Seattle Mariners

 Bill Lockyer (1941–) (a), California politician, former Attorney General, President Pro Tempore of the State Senate and  State Treasurer
 Thia Megia (1995–) (b), Filipino-American singer and guitarist, American Idol finalist
 Jon Miller (1951–) (r), ESPN  and Major League Baseball announcer
 Amobi Okugo (1991–) (b), soccer player with Philadelphia Union in Major League Soccer
 Bill Owens (1938–) (a), photographer, author of Suburbia, 1976 Guggenheim fellow, founder of Buffalo Bill's Brewery
 Brian Patterson (1965–) (b), bicycle motocross (BMX) racer
 Veronica Perez (1988–) (b), Mexican-American forward for the Mexico women's national football (soccer) team
Bill Quirk (1946–) (a), California State Assemblyman, former Hayward City Council member
 Romesh Ratnesar (1975–) (b), journalist, author, former deputy managing editor at TIME magazine,  member of the Council on Foreign Relations
 Mike Reilly (1944–2019) (b), Democratic Sonoma County supervisor

 Faye Hutchison Resnick (1957–), O.J. Simpson murder trial figure, crowned the Maid of Hayward 1975
 Rosa Gumataotao Rios (1965–) (r), former Treasurer of the United States
 Maud Russell (b) (1893–1989), welfare worker, educator, author
 Steve Sapontzis (1945–), professor emeritus of philosophy at California State University, East Bay
 Rapper Saweetie
 France Silva (1876–1951) (b), first U.S. Marine of Mexican-American and Hispanic heritage to receive the Medal of Honor
 Diamon Simpson (1987–) (r), basketball player in the Israel Basketball Premier League
 Henry Snyder (1929–2016) (b), professor emeritus of history at the University of California, Riverside 
 Sokei-an (1882–1945) (a), Japanese national, founder of the Rinzai Buddhist Society of America
 Spice 1 (1970–) (r), rap musician, active 1991 to present
 Shawn Stasiak (1970–) (b), professional wrestler, World Wrestling Federation / Entertainment fifteen time Hardcore Champion
 Bob Sweikert (1926–1956) (r), racing driver, Indianapolis 500 winner
Isaiah Taylor (born 1994), basketball player in the Israeli Basketball Premier League
 Erick Threets (1981–) (r), Major League Baseball pitcher
 Don Wakamatsu (1963–) (r), Major League Baseball player and manager

 Bill Walsh (1931–2007) (r), NFL Hall of Fame coach
 Andre Ward (1984–) (r), boxer, light heavyweight gold medalist in the 2004 Olympics, and current WBA World Super Middleweight champion
 Joan Weston (1935–1997) (a), A.K.A. the "Blonde Bomber", famous personality in the original roller derby
 Buddy Woodward (1963–) (r), musician, composer, singer, actor and anime voice performer; member of The Dixie Bee-Liners
 Kristi Yamaguchi (1971–) (b), professional figure skater, Olympic gold medalist and inductee into the U.S. Olympic Hall of Fame
Mike Young (1960–) (r), professional baseball player
 Hamza Yusuf (1958–) (a), American convert to Islam, Islamic scholar, co-founder of Zaytuna College originally located in Hayward, now in Berkeley
 Goto Zuigan (1879–1965) (a), Japanese Rinzai Buddhist, operated a strawberry farm in Hayward in the early 20th century
Tarik Skubal Professional baseball pitcher for The Detroit Tigers

References

Hayward
 
Hayward
Hayward, California